Elie Parish Church is a church building in Elie, Fife, Scotland.  It is Category B listed, its oldest surviving part (the clock tower) dating to the 1726. 

An earlier church on the site was built in 1639, the work of William Burn, with the tower following just under a century later. The kirkyard is contemporary with the original church. William Scott, of Ardross, was the benefactor for the 1639 church, while Sir John Anstruther donated the funds for the construction of the tower.

John Currie was responsible for renovations made in 1855. Around fifty years later, Peter MacGregor Chalmers added the east porch, vestry and organ chamber.

See also
 List of listed buildings in Elie and Earlsferry, Fife

Gallery

References

Category B listed buildings in Fife
Buildings and structures in Elie
19th-century churches
Churches in Fife
Listed churches in Scotland
Church of Scotland churches